Lieutenant General Arnold Quainoo is a Ghanaian former military officer and served as the Chief of Defence Staff of the Ghana Armed Forces from August 1983 to September 1989. He took over from Flight Lieutenant J. J. Rawlings and handed over to Lieutenant General Winston Mensa-Wood. He was also the first commander of the  Economic Community of West African States Monitoring Group (ECOMOG) which intervened in Liberia to help end the civil war. He also served twice as Army Commander, first in 1979 following the coup-d'état by the Armed Forces Revolutionary Council which overthrew the Supreme Military Council. He was replaced when the Limann government was elected. He was however re-appointed as Chief of Army Staff following the coup by the Provisional National Defence Council and later as General Officer Commanding the Ghana Armed Forces.

In 2014, Quainoo denied any responsibility for the death of Liberian President Samuel Doe.

References

Ghanaian military personnel
Chiefs of the Defence Staff (Ghana)
20th-century births
Possibly living people
Chiefs of Army Staff (Ghana)
Members of the Council of State (Ghana)
St. Augustine's College (Cape Coast) alumni